This is a list of Texas Longhorns baseball players selected in the MLB draft.

Key

† = Currently active in the MLB‡ = Currently active in the MiLB

Position key

Primary June draft selections
Here’s the list of players that were drafted and signed in the MLB Draft. Players that didn’t sign and either returned to college or retired from baseball were omitted. Only the players that were drafted and signed are on this list.

June secondary draft selections
Here’s the list of players that were drafted and signed in the MLB June secondary draft. Players that didn’t sign and either returned to college or retired from baseball were omitted. Only the players that were drafted and signed are on this list.

Draft selections by team

Awards, honors, and achievements from draft picks

World Series and postseason

MLB All-Star selections

MLB regular season awards

No-hitters

MLB Records

References

Texas Longhorns baseball